Riggio is a surname. Notable people with the surname include:

Cristian Riggio (born 1996), Italian footballer
Eliana Riggio, Italian UN official
Girolamo Riggio (died 1589), Roman Catholic priest
Leonard Riggio (born 1941), American businessman
Matt Riggio (born 1988), Australian rules footballer
Renato Riggio (born 1978), Argentine footballer